Alpthal is a village and municipality in Schwyz District in the canton of Schwyz in Switzerland. Besides the village of Alpthal, the municipality includes the ski resort of Brunni, and settlement of Eigen.

History
Alpthal is first mentioned in 1018 as Albetal. A branch of the Camino de Santiago pilgrimage route connected Einsiedeln with Schwyz via Alpthal and the Haggenegg.

Winter tourism first came to Alpthal in 1950, with the opening of the cable car from Brunni to the Holzegg. Brunni acquired its first ski lift in 1964, and the Brunni-Haggenegg ski area was commissioned in 1974.

Geography

The village of Alpthal is located in the upper reaches of the Alptal, the valley of the river Alp upstream from Einsiedeln. Also within the municipality of Alpthal are the popular ski resort of Brunni,  higher up the valley, and the settlement of Eigen,  down the valley. To the north and beyond Eigen, the Alp flows through the village Trachslau and further through the town of Einsiedeln some  beyond. To the west, south and east the municipality is surrounded by the peaks of the Nüsellstock, Näbikenfirst, Grossbrechenstock, Kleiner Mythen, Grosser Mythen, Rotenfluh, Furggelenstock and Gschwändstock. The Haggenegg, between the Kleiner Mythen and the Grossbrechenstock, and the Holzegg, between the Grosser Mythen and Rotenfluh, both cross towards Schwyz. Both Mythen and Hagenegg belong however to the municipality of Schwyz.

Of this area, 32.4% is used for agricultural purposes, while 62.8% is forested. Of the rest of the land, 1.6% is settled (buildings or roads) and the remainder (3.2%) is non-productive (rivers, glaciers or mountains).

Transport

The sole road access to the municipality is from the town of Einsiedeln in the form of a road following the Alp as far as Brunni. Hiking trails, only passable on foot in summer, cross both the Haggenegg and the Holzegg to the town of Schwyz. A cable car also links Brunni with the summit of the Holzegg, operating in both summer and winter.

PostBus Switzerland operates a near-hourly bus service from Einsiedeln railway station to Alpthal and Brunni. At Einsiedeln connection is made with Zurich S-Bahn services S13, to Wädenswil, and S40, to Rapperswil, with onward connections available to Zürich.

Demographics

, 4.9% of the population was made up of foreign nationals. Over the last 10 years the population has grown at a rate of 28%. Most of the population speaks German  (97.8%), with Albanian being second most common ( 1.8%) and Portuguese being third ( 0.4%).

 the gender distribution of the population was 52.4% male and 47.6% female. The age distribution, in Alpthal is; 128 people or 28.8% of the population is between 0 and 19. 131 people or 29.4% are 20 to 39, and 106 people or 23.8% are 40 to 64. The senior population distribution is 51 people or 11.5% are 65 to 74. There are 25 people or 5.6% who are 70 to 79 and 4 people or 0.90% of the population who are over 80.

 there are 172 households, of which 55 households (or about 32.0%) contain only a single individual. 15 or about 8.7% are large households, with at least five members.
In the 2007 election the most popular party was the SVP which received 66.6% of the vote. The next three most popular parties were the CVP (17.2%), the FDP (9.4%) and the SPS (4.5%).

In Alpthal about 59.5% of the population (between age 25–64) have completed either non-mandatory upper secondary education or additional higher education (either university or a Fachhochschule).

Alpthal has an unemployment rate of 0.66%. , there were 48 people employed in the primary economic sector and about 21 businesses involved in this sector. 14 people are employed in the secondary sector and there are 5 businesses in this sector. 46 people are employed in the tertiary sector, with 12 businesses in this sector.

There are 8 people (or about 1.80% of the population) who are Islamic. 10 (or about 2.25% of the population) belong to no church, are agnostic or atheist, and 8 individuals (or about 1.80% of the population) did not answer the question.

The historical population is given in the following table:

Weather
Alpthal has an average of 161.9 days of rain per year and on average receives  of precipitation. During this month there is precipitation for an average of 16.2 days.

References

External links
 
 
 Skilift Brunni 

Municipalities of the canton of Schwyz